Carlos Arthur Sevilla  (born August 9, 1935) is an American prelate of the Roman Catholic Church. He served as bishop of the Diocese of Yakima in Washington State from 1996 to 2011 and as an auxiliary bishop of the Archdiocese of San Francisco in California from 1988 to 1996.

Biography

Early life 
Carlos Sevilla was born on August 9, 1935, in San Francisco, California, and entered the Society of Jesus in 1953. He studied at Gonzaga University in Spokane, Washington, where he obtained his Master of Philosophy degree

Priesthood 
On June 3, 1966, Sevilla was ordained to the priesthood for the Society of Jesus in Rome by Archbishop John Quinn.  Sevilla made his solemn profession to the Society of Jesus on April 22, 1974.  Sevilla earned his Master of Theology degree from Santa Clara University in Santa Clara, California, and attended the Jesuit College Innsbruck in Innsbruck, Austria, and the Catholic Institute of Paris.

Auxiliary Bishop of San Francisco 
On December 6, 1988, Pope John Paul II appointed Sevilla as an auxiliary bishop of the Archdiocese of San Francisco and titular bishop of Mina. Sevilla received his episcopal consecration on January 25, 1989, from Archbishop John Quinn, with Bishops Mark Hurley and Michael Kaniecki serving as co-consecrators.

Bishop of Yakima 
On December 31, 1996, John Paul II named Sevilla as the sixth bishop of the Diocese of Yakima.  Sevilla is the second member of a religious order and the first Jesuit to hold that office.

Within the United States Conference of Catholic Bishops (USCCB) Sevilla sat on the Committee for Ecumenical and Interreligious Affairs and the Sub-Committee for Translation of Liturgical Texts into Spanish.  He also co-chaired the West Coast Dialogue of Catholics and Muslims. Sevilla is the former chair of the Committee on Religious Life and Ministry and the Sub-Committee for Translation of Liturgical Texts Into Spanish.

On April 1, 2008 Sevilla accepted blame for hiring Juan Gonzalez, a priest from Oregon, in 2003 to work as a retreat director for the diocese.  Gonzalez was being investigated at that time by police in Marion County, Oregon,  for viewing child pornography. Sevilla knew about the investigation, but hired Gonzalez anyway.  Police later notified Sevilla that charges had been filed against Gonzalez, but there was no follow-up by the diocese.

In May 8, 2008, Sevilla admitted that he failed to notify parishioners in the Diocese of Yakima about Jose Joaquin Estrada Arango, a priest convicted earlier in 2008 of fondling a 14 year-old girl in Oregon.  Estrada had worked in four parishes in the Diocese of Yakima between 2001 and 2003.

Retirement 
On May 31, 2011, with the installation of Bishop Joseph J. Tyson as the new bishop of Yakima, Sevilla became Bishop Emeritus.  He spent the next several years in Yakima, helping Tyson and working with local ministries.

In 2014, Sevilla testified in a civil lawsuit against the Diocese of Yakima.  The plaintiff claimed to have been sexually assaulted in 1999 at age 17 by seminarian Aaron Ramirez at Resurrection Catholic Church in Zillah, Washington.  The suit alleged that the diocese had been negligent in checking Ramirez's background when he applied to enter the priesthood. Ramirez fled to Mexico after the incident, where he became an Anglican priest.  Sevilla did not notify the Mexican Anglican archbishop about Ramirez's alleged crimes until 2005.

In July 2016, Sevilla moved into the Jesuit community at Bellarmine Preparatory School in San Jose, California. In July 2021, Sevilla entered Sacred Heart Jesuit Center, a retirement home for Catholic clergy in Los Gatos, California. Sevilla works as a spiritual director, arranges retreats and conferences and helps with weekend masses in local parishes.

See also
 

 Catholic Church hierarchy
 Catholic Church in the United States
 Historical list of the Catholic bishops of the United States
 List of Catholic bishops of the United States
 Lists of patriarchs, archbishops, and bishops

References

External links
Roman Catholic Diocese of Yakima Official Site
Catholic-Hierarchy
Diocese of Yakima
Committee for Ecumenical and Interreligious Affairs
West Coast Dialogue of Catholics and Muslims

1935 births
Living people
Gonzaga University alumni
Santa Clara University alumni
Institut Catholique de Paris alumni
Clergy from San Francisco
20th-century Roman Catholic bishops in the United States
20th-century American Jesuits
21st-century American Jesuits
Jesuit bishops
Roman Catholic bishops of Yakima
Catholics from California
21st-century Roman Catholic bishops in the United States